Heggie is a surname. Notable people with the surname include:

Bill Heggie (born 1927), Scottish footballer
Charles Heggie (1862–?), Scottish footballer
George Heggie (1879–1953), Irish-born Canadian politician
Jake Heggie (born 1961), American classical composer and pianist
O.P. Heggie (1877–1936), Australian actor
Robert Andrew Heggie (1915–2000), Canadian lawyer, judge and politician
Will Heggie, Scottish musician
Douglas C. Heggie, Scottish applied mathematician and astronomer